Ternstroemia gymnanthera is a species of flowering plant in the family Pentaphylacaceae which grows on elevations of  in Japan, China and on elevation of  in Himalayas.

References

gymnanthera
Flora of China
Flora of Japan